The women's 400 metres event at the 2023 European Athletics Indoor Championships will be held on 3 March 2023 at 10:40 (heats) and at 19:55 (semi-finals), and on 4 March at 20:30 (final) local time.

Medalists

Records

Results

Heats
Qualification: First 2 in each heat (Q) and the next 2 fastest (q) advance to the Semifinals.

Semifinals
Qualification: First 3 in each heat (Q) advance to the Final.

Final

References

2023 European Athletics Indoor Championships
400 metres at the European Athletics Indoor Championships